The A84 autoroute is a major motorway in western France completed on 27 January 2003 to connect the cities of Rennes in Brittany with Caen in Lower Normandy. It is part of the Autoroute des Estuaires from Belgium to Spain, avoiding Paris.

Characteristics
The motorway, 170 km long, cost a total of € 650 million. It is dual-carriageway both ways on its entire course and service areas are positioned at regular intervals. It is toll free.

The motorway was built with a special road surface to allow rain water to run off quickly, but it is ineffective with snow that often falls in large quantities in winter, so snowploughs are employed regularly. Motorway traffic radio 107.7 broadcasts A84 information specifically.

 2 × 2 carriageway
 170 km in length
 Total cost : €650 000 000  (2003)
 3 speed camera zones
 5 service areas (Aires de service et repos):
 l'aire du mont Saint-Michel (Total), Saint-Aubin-de-Terregatte
 l'aire de la Baie, Braffais
 l'aire de la vallée de la Vire (Shell), Gouvets
 l'aire de Cahagnes, Cahagnes
 l'aire de Saint-Jean des Essartiers, Saint-Jean-des-Essartiers

The highway is free throughout its entire length. The various governments have studied the concession of this highway, but the regional authorities of Brittany and Normandy have convinced the public authorities to build and manage this highway with public funds.

History
 1979: Ministerial decision to upgrade the road between Caen and Avranches to dual carriageway.
 1987: Decision by the CIAT to connect Caen, Rennes and Nantes by motorway ensuring the continuity of the French motorway network.
 1994: The connections between Caen and Avranches and Avranches and Rennes are declared of public utility.
 27 January 2003: Opening of the last section of the A84 except the Rennes and Avranches bypasses.

Route

List of junctions

Future extensions
The A84 is interrupted at Avranches. The bypass to the west of Avranches, by the RN 175 with two double lanes, has geometrical characteristics which do not allow the construction of motorway characteristics and status. An East motorway bypass for the A84 was therefore planned in the long term. The State bought 60 hectares of land and destroyed four houses along the route. However, the works are yet be launched. The land is still owned by the state.

The A84 is also to be extended to Nantes by upgrading the RN 137 dual-carriageway, thus creating a Caen-Rennes-Nantes route. This was abandoned, along with other projects of dual-carriageway upgrades in Brittany (RN 157 and RN 12 were planned to become A81 and RN 165 was planned to become A82). 

In addition at Rennes, the construction of a "south-east bypass" will make it possible to avoid the Rennes ring-road on this route. Construction was due to commence from 2021 but was abandoned.

External links
 A84 Motorway information in Saratlas

References

A84